Makhotso Magdeline "Maggie" Sotyu is the current Deputy Minister of Arts and Culture in South Africa.

See also

African Commission on Human and Peoples' Rights
Constitution of South Africa
History of the African National Congress
Politics in South Africa
Provincial governments of South Africa

References

Living people
African National Congress politicians
21st-century South African women politicians
21st-century South African politicians
Members of the National Assembly of South Africa
Women members of the National Assembly of South Africa
Year of birth missing (living people)